Be Mine may refer to:

"Be Mine" (Wild Orchid song), 1998
"Be Mine" (David Gray song), 2003
"Be Mine!" (Robyn song), 2005
"Be Mine" (Infinite song), 2011
"Be Mine!" (Maaya Sakamoto song), 2014
"Be Mine" (Ofenbach song), 2017
Be Mine (EP), a 2009 EP by Jonas Brothers
"Be Mine", a song by R.E.M. from New Adventures in Hi-Fi